Goschen is a locality in Victoria, Australia, located approximately 20 km from Swan Hill, Victoria.

Goschen Post Office opened on 6 November 1901 and closed in 1942.

See also
Viscount Goschen

References

Towns in Victoria (Australia)
Rural City of Swan Hill